Eriocapitella rivularis, a species of flowering plant in the buttercup family Ranunculaceae, is native to Asia. The specific epithet rivularis means "waterside, of the rivers", which evidently refers to one of its preferred habitats. It is commonly called the riverside windflower. In Chinese, it is called cao yu mei, which means "grass jade plum".

Description

Eriocapitella rivularis is a perennial herbaceous plant with a rhizome-like root structure. The leaf blades are lobed with three sections. Each leaf, being wider than it is long, has the overall shape of a pentagon. A whorl of 3 or 4 leaves (technically bracts) wraps around each stem. The stem leaves are similar in appearance to the basal leaves but somewhat smaller. The single flower at the end of each stalk has 5–10 sepals, but no petals. The petal-like sepals are usually white, tinged with blue on the reverse.

In its native habitat, E. rivularis flowers from May to August.

Taxonomy

Eriocapitella rivularis was described by Maarten J. M. Christenhusz and James W. Byng in 2018. Like other members of genus Eriocapitella, E. rivularis was formerly a member of genus Anemone. The basionym Anemone rivularis Buch.-Ham. ex DC. was described in 1817.

Distribution

Eriocapitella rivularis is native to Asia. It is found throughout the Himalaya region, across much of South Asia, East Asia, and Southeast Asia, ranging as far south as Sumatra in western Indonesia.

 Western Himalaya: North India
 Eastern Himalaya: Nepal, Assam (in northeast India), Tibet Autonomous Region
 South Asia: India, Sri Lanka
 East Asia: China
 Northwest China: Gansu, Ningxia, Qinghai, Shaanxi, Xinjiang, Qinghai
 North China: Hebei, Inner Mongolia
 Central China: Henan, Hubei
 South China: Guangxi
 Southwest China: Guizhou, Yunnan
 Southeast Asia: Laos, Myanmar, Vietnam

Its preferred habitats include meadows, forest margins, paddy fields, streamsides, and lakesides.

Bibliography

References

External links

 
 

rivularis
Flora of Asia
Plants described in 2018
Taxa named by Maarten J. M. Christenhusz
Taxa named by James W. Byng